Dharma Prabhu is a 2019 Indian Tamil language political fantasy comedy film written and directed by Muthukumaran. Yogi Babu plays the lead role in the film, and supporting roles are done by Radha Ravi, Sam Jones, Ramesh Thilak, Rekha and Rajendran among others. Justin Prabhakaran composed the music for the film, editing was done by San Lokesh, and cinematography was by Mahesh Muthuswamy.

Plot
The God of death, the senior Yama (Radha Ravi), retires so that his son (Yogi Babu) has become the immediate successor. Yamaloga's Chitragupta (Ramesh Thilak) is enraged with the decision of Yama. He cunningly plans to dethrone Yama Jr. who has just become the king of their world. Chitragupta's plan works when Yama Jr. visits the earth and saves the life of an innocent child along with a deadly politician (Azhagam Perumal). Now, Lord Shiva (Rajendran) orders Yama Jr. to kill the politician in a week and rectify all the mistakes. Can the fun-loving Yama rectify his mistakes?

Cast 

Yogi Babu as Dharma Prabhu
 Radha Ravi as Yaman 
 Sam Jones as Bala
 Ramesh Thilak as Chitragupta
 Rajendran as Shiva
 Rekha as Ayyo
 Meghna Naidu cameo appearance 
 Azhagam Perumal as Kumaradasan the Politician
 Bose Venkat as Minister
 Bosskey as "Kho" Rangasamy
 Shanmugam Muthusamy as Yama Guru
 Supergood Subramani
 PV Chandramoulli
 Ashvin Raja as Cameo appearance
 Janani Iyer as Vaishnavi, Politician Kumaradasan's daughter

Production 
This film shooting was held in a fictional place due to the cast and the story. Yaman stays in place called Yamaloka, so the art works were done mostly in a fictional way. The first look poster of Dharmaprabhu was released on 2 November, where Yogi Babu stands as Yaman with the weapon Gada. The film shooting was a short time of period and the movie features was released soon. The film was shot in Chennai and the songs were composed abroad. One of the first look poster reminds one of Thambi Ramiah’s directorial film Indiralohathil Na Azhagappan.

Soundtrack 
Soundtrack was composed by Justin Prabhakaran.
"Oorar Unna" - Tm Selvakumar 
"Usurula Ethayo" - Yogi Sekar, Aishwarya Ravichandran 
"Katta Karuppa" - Acs Ravichandran, Ranina Reddy

Reception
Times of India wrote "The plot had enough scope for making it a wholesome entertainer, but one needs to watch the movie to know how it has been badly wasted." Cinema Express wrote "Dharma Prabhu quite needlessly takes on the mantle of messaging. It appears even narakalokam isn’t immune to the rampant disease of posturing." Sify wrote "Apart from Imsai Arasan 23am Pulikecei, none of the Tamil fantasy comedies have clicked in Tamil mainly because of shoddy writing and execution. Leading comedy actor Yogi Babu’s Dharmaprabhu in which he plays the lead title role is another addition to the genre, which disappoints."

References 

2010s Tamil-language films
2010s fantasy comedy films
Indian fantasy comedy films
Indian adventure comedy films
Films shot in Chennai
2010s adventure comedy films
Films scored by Justin Prabhakaran
2019 comedy films
2019 films